In mathematics, a Hamiltonian matrix is a -by- matrix  such that  is symmetric, where  is the skew-symmetric matrix

In other words,  is Hamiltonian if and only if  where  denotes the transpose.

Properties

Suppose that the -by- matrix  is written as the block matrix

Another equivalent condition is that  is of the form  with  symmetric.

It follows easily from the definition that the transpose of a Hamiltonian matrix is Hamiltonian. Furthermore, the sum (and any linear combination) of two Hamiltonian matrices is again Hamiltonian, as is their commutator. It follows that the space of all Hamiltonian matrices is a Lie algebra, denoted . The corresponding Lie group is the symplectic group . This group consists of the symplectic matrices, those matrices  which satisfy . Thus, the matrix exponential of a Hamiltonian matrix is symplectic. However the logarithm of a symplectic matrix is not necessarily Hamiltonian because the exponential map from the Lie algebra to the group is not surjective.

The characteristic polynomial of a real Hamiltonian matrix is even. It follows that the trace of a Hamiltonian matrix is zero.

The square of a Hamiltonian matrix is skew-Hamiltonian (a matrix  is skew-Hamiltonian if ). Conversely, every skew-Hamiltonian matrix arises as the square of a Hamiltonian matrix.

Extension to complex matrices
As for symplectic matrices, the definition for Hamiltonian matrices can be extended to complex matrices in two ways. One possibility is to say that a matrix  is Hamiltonian if , as above. Another possibility is to use the condition  where the superscript asterisk denotes the conjugate transpose.

Hamiltonian operators
Let  be a vector space, equipped with a symplectic form . A linear map  is called a Hamiltonian operator with respect to  if the form   is symmetric. Equivalently, it should satisfy

A linear operator is Hamiltonian with respect to  if and only if its matrix in this basis is Hamiltonian.

References

Matrices